Kyōto 1st district was a constituency of the House of Representatives in the Diet of Japan. Between 1947 and 1993 it elected five Representatives by single non-transferable vote. It was located in Kyōto and consisted, as of 1993, of the cities of Kyōto city's wards of Sakyō, Higashiyama, Kamigyō, Kita, Nakagyō, Shimogyō, Minami and Yamashina. Today, the area is split between Kyōto 1st and 2nd single-member electoral districts.

Kyōto is the stronghold of the Japanese Communist Party and the 1st district was among the few in the country where the party ever nominated more than one candidate – successfully so in the 1972 and 1979 elections; but in 1990, it lost both candidates due to vote splitting. Facing dwindling support for the major parties in the 1970s, the LDP often nominated only two candidates, the JSP just one candidate in Kyoto 1st district.

Summary of results during the 1955 party system 
Representatives elected/candidates running.

Elected Representatives

Most recent election results

References 

Politics of Kyoto Prefecture
Districts of the House of Representatives (Japan)